Jim Sherry (born 9 September 1973) is a Scottish former footballer who played as a midfielder for Hamilton Academical and Livingston.

Career

Playing career
Sherry began his career at Rangers as a schoolboy, but did not make a single first team appearance for the club.

He then signed as a youth team player for Hamilton Academical and then graduated to the first team, making 94 appearances and scoring 11 goals for the Accies.

In 1998, ambitious Livingston had invested heavily in their playing squad and recruited Sherry to the Almondvale Stadium.  He was part of the team that won 1998–99 Scottish Second Division.  However Sherry found regular game time difficult to come by and had loan spells at Portadown and for his former club Hamilton Academical.  He re-signed for the Accies permanently in 2000.

Sherry made 86 appearances in his second spell at New Douglas Park between 2000-2004 before retiring from the professional game.

Post playing career
Sherry is now a football agent.

Honours
 Livingston
Scottish Football League Second Division : 1998-99

References

External links
Jim Sherry on Soccerbase

1973 births
Living people
Scottish footballers
Scottish Football League players
Association football defenders
Livingston F.C. players
Hamilton Academical F.C. players
Rangers F.C. players
Portadown F.C. players
Footballers from Glasgow